The Royal Croatian Home Guard (often  simply Domobranstvo or Domobran in singular, in German: Croatisch-Slawonische Landwehr) was the Croatian-Slavonian army section of the Royal Hungarian Landwehr, which existed from 1868 to 1918. The force was created by decree of the Croatian Parliament on December 5, 1868, as a result of the Croatian–Hungarian Settlement.

The settlement specified four conditions:
 Croats (and Croatian Serbs) would serve their military service within Croatia
 Military training would be conducted in Croatian
 Cadet and Domobran academies would be formed
 Croatian military units could take on Croatian names

Formations and units
The Home Guard initially consisted of 8 squadrons, garrisoned in 6 town:

 79th Home Guard Squadron (Varaždin)
 80th Home Guard Squadron (Zagreb)
 81st Home Guard Squadron (Virovitica)
 82nd Home Guard Squadron (Vukovar)
 29th Home Guard Squadron (Varaždin)
 30th Home Guard Squadron (Varaždin)
 31st Home Guard Squadron (Vinkovci)
 32nd Home Guard Squadron (Vinkovci)

Following a reform, it was reorganized into 8 battalions each garrisoned in a different town:

 83rd Home Guard Battalion (Sisak)
 84th Home Guard Battalion (Bjelovar)
 87th Home Guard Battalion (Gospić)
 88th Home Guard Battalion (Ogulin)
 89th Home Guard Battalion (Švarča)
 90th Home Guard Battalion (Glina)
 91st Home Guard Battalion (Nova Gradiška)
 92nd Home Guard Battalion (Mitrovica)

Following a second reform, it was reorganized into 5 regiments, each in 5 major cities:

 25th Home Guard Infantry Regiment (Zagreb)
 26th Home Guard Infantry Regiment (Karlovac)
 27th Home Guard Infantry Regiment (Sisak)
 28th Home Guard Infantry Regiment (Osijek)
 10th Home Guard Cavalry Regiment (Varaždin)

Commanders
Count  (1869–1875).
 (1875–1880).
 (1881–1890).
 (1890–1893).
 (1893–1897).
Josip Bach (1897–1901).
 (1901–1903).
 (1903–1907).
Svetozar Boroević (1907–1912).
Stjepan Sarkotić (1912–1914).
Ivan Salis Seewis (1915).
Anton Lipošćak (1915–1916, 1917).
 (1916–1917).
 (1917–1918).
 (1918).

World War I
 
The 42nd Home Guard Infantry Division consisting of the 25th, 26th, 27th and 28th Home Guard Infantry regiment under the Command of Stjepan Sarkotić took part in the battle against Serbia in August, 1914 together with the 104th Landsturm (pučko-ustaška) Brigade under the Command of Theodor Bekić. In late 1918, elements of various Royal Croatian Home Guard regiments took part in occupation of Međimurje.

Legacy
During World War II, the Independent State of Croatia was formed and its regular army was also called the "Croatian Home Guard". It existed from April 1941 to May 1945.

On 24 December 1991, during the Croatian War of Independence, a part of the Croatian Army was formed that was also called the "Home Guard" ("Domobranstvo"). It ceased to exist in a 2003 reorganization.

See also

 Military of Austria-Hungary
 1918 protest in Zagreb

References

 
Austro-Hungarian Army
Military history of Croatia
19th century in Croatia
20th century in Croatia
Military units and formations established in 1868
Military units and formations disestablished in 1918
19th-century military history of Croatia
20th-century military history of Croatia